Datuk Ahmad Amzad bin Hashim (Jawi  احمد امزاد بن هاشم; born 15 January 1970) is a Malaysian politician who has served as the Member of Parliament (MP) for Kuala Terengganu since May 2018. He served as the Deputy Minister of Science, Technology and Innovation for the second term in the Barisan Nasional (BN) administration under former Prime Minister Ismail Sabri Yaakob and former Minister Adham Baba from August 2021 to the collapse of the BN administration in November 2022 and the first term in Perikatan Nasional (PN) administration under former Prime Minister Muhyiddin Yassin and former Minister Khairy Jamaluddin from March 2020 to the collapse of the PN administration in August 2021. He is a member of the Malaysian Islamic Party (PAS), a component party of the PN coalition.

Background 

He was born on 15 January 1970, at Kuala Terengganu General Hospital (HBKT).

He received his education at the Sultan Mahmud Secondary School of Science (SESMA), an elite school at the time in Terengganu and a graduate of accounting in Universiti Kebangsaan Malaysia.

Career 

Upon completing his studies, he established his name in the field of shipping with MSET Shipbuilding Corporation SDN. BHD as the managing director from 1995 to 2004, raising the name of the company to the name of Southeast Asia.

Personal life 

He is married to Suriati Abidin in 1992. On 12 February 2016, Hajah Suriati died from pancreatic cancer.
Later, Amzad married Dr. Nur Diana Ahmad Takri in 2017. Haji Amzad now has 9 children, 5 sons and 4 daughters.

Election results

Honour
  :
  Commander of the Order of the Territorial Crown (PMW) – Datuk (2021)

References

1970 births
Living people
Malaysian Islamic Party politicians